Marcel Arnold (born 17 January 1962) is a Swiss sprinter. He competed in the men's 400 metres at the 1984 Summer Olympics.

References

External links
 

1962 births
Living people
Athletes (track and field) at the 1984 Summer Olympics
Swiss male sprinters
Olympic athletes of Switzerland
Place of birth missing (living people)